The Challenger La Manche is a professional tennis tournament played on indoor hard courts. It is currently part of the Association of Tennis Professionals (ATP) Challenger Tour. It has been held annually at the Complexe Sportif Chantereyne in Cherbourg, France since 1994.

Past finals

Singles

Doubles

External links
Official website
ITF Search

 
Hard court tennis tournaments
ATP Challenger Tour
Sport in Cherbourg-en-Cotentin
Tennis tournaments in France
Recurring sporting events established in 1994